Tymofiy Koreichuk (c. 1879 – October, 1919) was a prominent peasant politician in Galicia and Bukovina (now Ukraine) who became an early Ukrainian Canadian labour leader.

Koreichuk was born in Kitsman county in Austria-Hungary. In young adulthood, he formed a local branch of the Sich Society, an organization that promoted physical education and national consciousness. He formed the Bukovynian section of the Ukrainian Social Democratic Party. Under this party, he ran in the Bukovynian Diet in 1911.

Koreichuk emigrated to Canada, apparently, in the spring of 1913. He was one of the most experienced labour organizers in North America from Ukraine and quickly became active in the Federation of Ukrainian Social Democrats (FUSD) in Montreal, Quebec. When the FUSD renamed itself the Ukrainian Social Democratic Party of Canada (USDPC) and moved its headquarters to Winnipeg, Manitoba in January 1914, Koreichuk followed. While working with the USDPC in Western Canada in the spring of 1915, he was interned with other unnaturalized Ukrainian workers in the Crowsnest Pass.

On September 5, 1919, Koreichuck was arrested with making "seditious speeches". Still an unnaturalized Austro-Hungarian subject, he was sent to an internment camp in Vernon, British Columbia. After a few weeks, he died of tuberculosis.

See also
 Ukrainian Canadian internment

References

External links
Biography at the Dictionary of Canadian Biography Online

1870s births
1919 deaths
20th-century deaths from tuberculosis
Canadian socialists
Canadian trade unionists
Ukrainian politicians before 1991
Canadian socialists of Ukrainian descent
Ukrainian emigrants to Canada
People from Chernivtsi Oblast
Austro-Hungarian politicians
Austro-Hungarian emigrants to Canada
Prisoners who died in Canadian detention
Tuberculosis deaths in British Columbia
Ukrainian Austro-Hungarians
People from the Duchy of Bukovina